Nimbochromis linni is a species of cichlid endemic to Lake Malawi where it prefers areas with rocky substrates, though it occasionally enters intermediate habitats.  This species can reach a length of  TL.  It can also be found in the aquarium trade. The specific name honours D. Wayne Linn of the Fisheries Office in Malawi, whose help to Herbert R. Axelrod made his field trip to Lake Malawi possible.

References

linni
Fish of Lake Malawi
Fish of Malawi
Fish described in 1975
Taxonomy articles created by Polbot